Royal Stoke University Hospital (formerly the University Hospital of North Staffordshire) is a teaching and research hospital at Hartshill in the English county of Staffordshire.  It lies in the city of Stoke-on-Trent, near the border with Newcastle-under-Lyme, and is one of the largest hospitals in the country and a major local employer, with over 6,000 staff. It is run by the University Hospitals of North Midlands NHS Trust.

History

The first hospital on the site, known as the Parish Hospital, was completed in 1842. This facility evolved to become the London Road Hospital and Institution by the early 20th century and became the City General Hospital in 1945. It joined the National Health Service in 1948.

New facilities were procured under a Private Finance Initiative contract to replace both the City General Hospital and the North Staffordshire Royal Infirmary in 2007. The works, which were designed Ryder / HKS and carried out by Laing O'Rourke at a cost of £370 million on the old City General Hospital site, were completed August 2012.

Keele University School of Medicine
It is the main teaching hospital for the Keele University School of Medicine. The clinical undergraduate medical school and postgraduate medical school buildings are in the grounds of the hospital, as well as the Clinical Education Centre and the Keele University Health Library which is the main teaching facility for the School of Nursing and Midwifery.

Staffordshire Children's Hospital
In March 2020 the Staffordshire Children's Hospital was launched as a "hospital within a hospital". Paediatric patients have access to specialist clinical teams, who care for children with complex conditions or medical problems.

See also
 Healthcare in Staffordshire
 List of hospitals in England

References

External links
 Royal Stoke University Hospital

Buildings and structures in Stoke-on-Trent
Education in Stoke-on-Trent
Hospitals in Staffordshire
Keele University
NHS hospitals in England
Teaching hospitals in England
Poor law infirmaries
Voluntary hospitals